Hellfried Heilfort (born 10 April 1955 in Groitzsch) is a German former sport shooter who competed in the 1980 Summer Olympics.

References

1955 births
Living people
People from Groitzsch
German male sport shooters
ISSF rifle shooters
Olympic shooters of East Germany
Shooters at the 1980 Summer Olympics
Olympic silver medalists for East Germany
Olympic medalists in shooting
Medalists at the 1980 Summer Olympics
Sportspeople from Saxony